Marina Andreyevna Aganina (born 21 June 1985) is an Uzbekistani retired pair skater. With Artem Knyazev, she is the 2004–05 Uzbekistani national champion and competed at the 2006 Winter Olympics.

Career 
Aganina's first skating partner was Renat Sabirov. She teamed up with Artem Knyazev in 2000. The pair was coached by Petr Kiprushev in Pervouralsk. In the 2005–06 season, Knyazev began helping coach himself and Aganina. They represented Uzbekistan at the 2006 Winter Olympics in Turin, where they placed 16th. Knyazev retired from competition following the 2006–07 season.

In the summer of 2007, Aganina began a partnership with Dmitry Zobnin which lasted three seasons. They attempted to qualify for the 2010 Winter Olympics at the 2009 Nebelhorn Trophy but were unsuccessful.

Programs

With Zobnin

With Knyazev

Results
GP: Grand Prix

With Zobnin

With Knyazev

With Sabirov

References

External links

 
 

Uzbekistani female pair skaters
Figure skaters at the 2006 Winter Olympics
Olympic figure skaters of Uzbekistan
Sportspeople from Tashkent
Living people
1985 births
Asian Games medalists in figure skating
Figure skaters at the 2003 Asian Winter Games
Figure skaters at the 2007 Asian Winter Games
Uzbekistani expatriates in Russia
Asian Games bronze medalists for Uzbekistan
Medalists at the 2003 Asian Winter Games
Medalists at the 2007 Asian Winter Games
21st-century Uzbekistani women